Volodymyr Mykolayovych Rudyuk (born 22 April 2000) is a Ukrainian professional footballer who plays as a central midfielder for Ukrainian club Prykarpattia Ivano-Frankivsk on loan from Rukh Lviv.

References

External links
 Profile on Prykarpattia Ivano-Frankivsk official website
 
 

2000 births
Living people
People from Khmelnytskyi Oblast
Ukrainian footballers
Association football midfielders
FC Karpaty Lviv players
FC Rukh Lviv players
FC Prykarpattia Ivano-Frankivsk (1998) players
Ukrainian First League players
Ukraine youth international footballers